Sevastopol Sports Complex is a football stadium in Sevastopol, located in the Crimea. It is currently used for football matches, and was the home of FC Sevastopol in the Ukrainian Premier League. The stadium's capacity is 5,864.

References

FC Sevastopol
Sports venues completed in 1985
Sport in Sevastopol
Football venues in Crimea
1985 establishments in the Soviet Union